Rocca Pietore is a comune (municipality) in the Province of Belluno in the Italian region Veneto, located about  north of Venice and about  northwest of Belluno.

References

Cities and towns in Veneto